Juriy Cannarsa  (born 22 April 1976 in Turin) is an Italian football defender.

He played 2 seasons (41 games) in the Serie A for Reggina Calcio.

In July 2010, he was signed by Savona.

On 4 January 2015, he was named new assistant coach of Livorno under new boss Ezio Gelain.

References

External links
 

1976 births
Living people
Italian footballers
Association football defenders
Serie A players
Delfino Pescara 1936 players
Fermana F.C. players
U.S. Livorno 1915 players
Reggina 1914 players
Frosinone Calcio players
U.S. Salernitana 1919 players
S.S. Arezzo players
Savona F.B.C. players
Footballers from Turin